is the pseudonym of a Japanese comic book artist and writer.

Personal life 

Peach Momoko was born in Japan's Saitama Prefecture. As a child, she lived in the cities of Kumagaya and Gyōda. Her father had attended photography school and enjoyed painting, and her grandfather was an oil painter.

Momoko began drawing as soon as she was able to hold a crayon. She attended school for video game design, during which time she realized that she wanted a career making illustrations. Devised during her art school years, the Peach Momoko pseudonym was the result of the artist "goofing around" with some of her friends. In 2009, she used the Peach Momoko pseudonym for an exhibition in Japan, and continued to use the name in the summer of 2010 when she moved to Portland, Oregon.

Momoko returned to Japan around September 2013. , Momoko was living with her husband and art manager, and their pet dog, Momo.

Career 

Though claiming that no specific influence inspired her to become an artist, Momoko admits that seeing Atsushi Kaneko's works as a high school student is when she decided to become an illustrator. 

In 2008, Momoko was invited to participate in a group gallery exhibition that would take place in America during June of that year. She was hesitant to accept, since she would have to quit her publishing company job to stay in the United States for a month. In 2010, Momoko and her husband collaborated on a live painting mural at the Peoples Art of Portland Gallery. In 2013, Momoko began placing her art on t-shirts, noting that this would be a means for collectors to more affordably purchase her work. In April 2014, Momoko participated in her first European gallery exhibition, the multi-artist showcase "1st NSK Folk Art Biennale: NSK: Past - Present – Future // 1984 – 2014 – 2045" organized by Neue Slowenische Kunst in Leipzig, Germany.

After graduating from art school, Momoko was an editor at a pornographic magazine, and she had uncredited illustrations published in the horoscope section of a 2008 issue of the  femdom magazine. She considers her first published comic book work to be her illustrations for the Winter 2013 and Spring 2014 issues of Girls and Corpses magazine.

In early 2015, Momoko participated in her first Japanese conventions, the manga marketplace Comitia and the art-oriented Artism Market. In October 2015, Momoko had her first exposure to comic conventions when she joined Girls and Corpses’ owner Robert Steven Rhine at Comikaze, where he introduced her to an editor at Heavy Metal. Afterwards, Momoko was invited to participate in Heavy Metal’s 40th-anniversary art exhibition, and met with Grant Morrison and other editors at the magazine who offered to publish short stories written and illustrated by her, resulting in short features which appearing in issues 288 and 290. Momoko has referred to these pieces as "short story sequential pin-up style" art.

In August 2016, Momoko participated in Portland's annual Forest for the Trees public art project, creating a mural at Cider Riot (807 NE Couch Street). In 2017, to commemorate Miyavi's 15th year as a solo artist, Momoko was selected to create an official t-shirt design for the musician. In 2018, Momoko collaborated with lifestyle brand HVYBLK on a t-shirt that was available at that year's Anime Expo.

In 2018, Momoko created the cover illustration for the German Blu-ray + DVD "Mediabook" release of the Japanese splatter film Kodoku: Meatball Machine. That year, she participated in several fine art gallery exhibitions and conventions, including Armageddon Expo (New Zealand), Chicago Comic & Entertainment Expo (USA), Emerald City Comic Con (USA), Fantasy Basel (Switzerland), Lucca Comics & Games (Italy), Monsterpalooza (USA), New York Comic Con (USA), and Singapore Comic Con (Singapore).

Comic book artist Adi Granov introduced Momoko to Marvel Comics and aided her entrance into the comic book industry. Momoko's first comic book illustration for a major publisher was a variant cover for Marvel Comics' Marvel Rising #1 (March 2019). Momoko contributed eleven illustrations for the base set of the 2019 Upper Deck Flair Marvel trading card series and illustrated the entire 90-card base set of the 2020 Upper Deck Marvel Anime trading card series.

During the COVID-19 pandemic, at a time when Momoko still felt "new to the [comics] industry," she produced upwards  of 20 cover illustrations per month, a decision she considers in hindsight to have been "a bit too ambitious" especially as she "started to see people getting annoyed with so many [of her] covers coming out at once."

In late 2020, Momoko signed an exclusive deal to Marvel as part of Marvel's Stormbreakers line-up of rising star artists. She was however allowed to finish up her her prior agreements and continues to provide variant covers for various creator-owned titles.

In 2021, Marvel Comics launched Momoko's Demon Days series, creating what the artist referred to as her "Momoko-verse", a setting which reimagined the company's superhero characters within the framework of Japanese folktales.  Demon Days was published as a series of five one-shot issues before being collected as a trade paperback in May 2022. In April 2022, a sequel to Demon Days was announced, titled Demon Wars, which adapts Marvel's Civil War storyline within the Momoko-verse framework.

In October 2022, Momoko made her first appearance at New York Comic Con. The line for her free autographs was the longest among all visiting artists, and the high demand for her signature prompted a conflict among retailers who were competing in line before the show's opening on the final day. Momoko was forced to leave her table and cancel signings to alleviate the conflict.

Artistic Style

Aesthetic 
Her aesthetic has been likened to the bishōjo ("beautiful girl") cultural phenomenon in Japan, though she uses this imagery to "fuse the power of a girl with her inner madness, weaponry, and propaganda".

Momoko prefers to tell stories involving samurai, Japanese folktales, dreamlike situations, and the real-life problems of adolescents. In her early career, she chose to "only illustrate the females in my artwork", noting how the viewer "can not tell by the expressions if they are dead, or if they are alive". Momoko often envisions her work in color but draws in black-and-white, focusing on the balance and contrast between light and shadow. After living in the United States, Momoko's early work introduced "many historical, social[,] and economic symbols and implications about Japan" in order to provide "a Japanese perspective on Japanese society".

In June 2015, Momoko stated she was conflicted about if she was an illustrator or a painter, leading her to question "who I am [as an artist], but now I think that's fine". Early in her professional career, Momoko's work was attributed as being inspired by early 20th century Japanese ad design filtered though a dark sense of humor. Her main motifs from this time are noted to be contrasting the images of women and death.

As she continued to work in American comics, her approach to female imagery began to blend different qualities of femininity: "When I try to draw an erotic pose or situation, it ends up becoming more about the confidence and strength of the character, so I guess those qualities are the same in my eyes."

Inspirations 
Momoko has stated that her art is primarily inspired by several genres of Japanese cinema, specifically horror, military, and pink films, as well as various styles of music. She also draws inspiration from the line work of tattoo artists. Since her childhood, she feels she has been strongly influenced by watching Studio Ghibli films.

Prior to living the United States, Momoko valued the style of American comic books and did not appreciate most Japanese styles of art, but changed her views while living outside of Japan. At that time, she began to appreciate Japanese folk art from the 1960s and 1970s. In 2018, Momoko believed that she did "not have a set [art] style" as it could limit her client reach, but she believed herself to be inspired by Japanese nostalgia and ad design from the 1960s to 1980s.

Exhibitions

Solo 

  at the Vanilla Gallery, Tokyo, Japan (April 13–18, 2015)
 Peach Momoko Pop Up at the Hellion Gallery, Portland, OR, USA (September 14–30, 2013)
 Peach MoMoKo at The Lovecraft, Portland, OR, USA (October 2012)
 Beautiful and Disturbing at the Hellion Gallery, Portland, OR, USA (April 7–30, 2011)

Group 

 Guillermo del Toro: Inspirations, Curiosities & Other Oddities at the Copro Gallery, Santa Monica, CA, USA (October 7–28, 2017)
 Heavy Metal 40th Anniversary Art Show at the Copro Gallery, presented in partnership with Heavy Metal Magazine, Santa Monica, CA, USA (July 15 – August 19, 2017)
 Dreamworks Voltron Legendary Defender at the Hero Complex Gallery, Los Angeles, CA, USA (June 2016)
 Disney's Alice Through The Looking Glass Art Showcase at the Hero Complex Gallery, presented in partnership with Disney Fine Art by Collectors Editions, Los Angeles, CA, USA (May 2016)
 Permanence at the Haven Gallery, Newport, NY, USA (February 2016)
  at the Vanilla Gallery, Tokyo, Japan (February 8–20, 2016)
 Art Not Image at the Hellion Gallery, Portland, OR, USA (February 2016)
 The First Annual Ema Show at the Hellion Gallery, Portland, OR, USA (March 5–7, 2015) and the HPGRP Gallery, Tokyo, Japan (March 13–23, 2015)
 The Art Fair +Plus -Ultra at the Spiral, Tokyo, Japan (October 2014)
 1st NSK Folk Art Biennale: NSK: Past - Present – Future // 1984 – 2014 – 2045 at Spinnerei, Leipzig, Germany (April 2014)
 Seriously Graphic at the Gallery Zero, Portland, OR, USA (May 4–26, 2013)
 Raw: Underground at the Bossanova Ballroom, Portland, OR, USA (March 2013)
 Big 300 at the Goodfoot Gallery, Portland, OR, USA (December 2012)
 I am, there for I think at the Goodfoot Gallery, Portland, OR, USA (October 25 – November 28, 2012)
 FanFare: The Art of Science Fiction and Fantasy at the Peoples Art of Portland Gallery, Portland, OR, USA (August 18 – September 9, 2012)
 PSY at Alberta Street Fair via The Lovecraft, Portland, OR, USA (April 26, 2012)
 Horror Artists Around the World: Horror Art for your Xmas Gift at The Lovecraft, Portland, OR, USA (December 2–31, 2011)
 88 Strong at the Goodfoot Gallery, Portland, OR, USA (September 2011)
 The 2nd Annual New Brow of Portland at the Portland Center for the Performing Arts, Portland, OR, USA (September 2011)
 The Scorpio Show at the PoBoy Art Gallery, Portland, OR, USA (November 2010)
  at the Design Festa Gallery, Tokyo, Japan (November 21–27, 2009)

Awards and honors 

In January 2015, Momoko's  illustration was selected for publication in the Infected By Art, Volume 3 art book.

In January 2016, the same illustration received the Gold Award in the Pen/Ink/Pencil category of the fourth Infected By Art competition.

In 2021, Momoko received the Eisner Award for Best Cover Artist based on her single issue work on Buffy the Vampire Slayer #19, Mighty Morphin #2, Something Is Killing the Children #12, Power Rangers #1, her series work on The Crow: Lethe, Die!namite, and Vampirella, and her variant cover work for Marvel Comics.

Bibliography 

This is an abridged listing of Momoko's works, limited to her sequential comics appearances and sole creator publications.

 Demon Days Treasury Edition (5-issue comic series collection, March 2022, Marvel Comics)
 The Official Horizon Zero Dawn Peach Momoko Poster Portfolio (24-page poster portfolio, December 2021, Titan Books Limited)
 Emily and Catbeast (1-page back-up comic segment in Strange Academy Presents: The Death of Doctor Strange #1, November 2021, Marvel Comics, UPC 759606202027 )
 Marvel Portfolio: Peach Momoko (12-sheet portfolio, March 2021, Marvel Comics)
 Peach MoMoKo: The Variant Covers (20-page digital-only cover art collection, December 2020, Marvel Comics)
 "Tohko" (short comic story in Heavy Metal #290, June 2018, Heavy Metal Media LLC, EAN 0-92567-36587-6 )
  (art book, December 2017, 60 Brigade Books)
 "Shaman Himiko" (short comic story in Heavy Metal #288, November 2017, Heavy Metal Media LLC, EAN 0-92567-36587-6 )
  (60-page art book, June 2016, 60 Brigade Books)
  (44-page art book, April 2014, [publisher unspecified])

Notes

References

Citations

Sources 

 
 
 
 
 
 
 
 
 
 
 
 
 
 
 
 
 
 
 
 
 
 
 
 
 
 
 
 
 
 
 
 
 
 
 
 
 
 
 
 
 
 
 
 
 
 
 
 
 
 
 
 
 
 
  Note: This was Momoko's early online "diary" as confirmed by its inclusion in the menu links of her official website, circa 2013.

External links
 
 Peach Momoko cover artist checklist at Comicbookinvest.com (CBSI), a comic book collecting resource
 Peach Momoko on Comic Vine
 Peach Momoko at the Grand Comics Database
 
 Peach Momoko artist checklist at Key Collector Comics, a comic book collecting resource
 

21st-century Japanese women writers
21st-century pseudonymous writers
Eisner Award winners for Best Cover Artist
Female comics writers
Japanese female comics artists
Japanese illustrators
Japanese women illustrators
Living people
Pseudonymous artists
Year of birth missing (living people)